Helmut Walser Smith (born 10 December 1962, in Freiburg, Germany) was named in 2004 to the Martha Rivers Ingram chair as Professor of History at Vanderbilt University. His teaching and writing focus on modern German history, especially the long nineteenth century. He has served on the editorial boards of Central European History and the Journal of Modern History and in 2011–12 was past president of the Conference Group on Central European History of the American Historical Association. From 2005 to 2008, he was Director of the Robert Penn Warren Center for the Humanities at Vanderbilt and in 2014 received a Guggenheim Fellowship.

Smith earned a B.A. at Cornell University in 1984, and received his PhD from Yale University in 1992, where his 1991 dissertation was on nationalism and religion in Wilhelmine Germany.

Monographs 
 German Nationalism and Religious Conflict (Princeton, 1995)
 The Butcher’s Tale: Murder and Anti-Semitism in a German Town (New York, 2002)
 Protestants, Catholics and Jews in Germany, 1800-1914, ed. (Oxford, 2002)
 Exclusionary Violence: Antisemitic Riots in Modern German History, co-ed. with Werner Bergmann and Christhard Hoffmann (Ann Arbor, 2002)
 The Holocaust and other Genocides: History, Representation, Ethics, ed. (Nashville, 2002)
 The Continuities of German History: Nation, Religion, and Race across the Long Nineteenth Century (New York, 2008)
 The Oxford Handbook of Modern German History, ed.  (Oxford, 2011).
 Germany. A Nation in Its Time. Before, During, and After Nationalism (New York, 2020)

Essays 

 "The Vanishing Point of German History: An Essay on Perspective." History and Memory 17, no. 2 (Spring–Winter 2005): 267–295.

References 

1. http://as.vanderbilt.edu/history/bio/helmut-smith
2. http://as.vanderbilt.edu/german/bio/helmut-smith-german

Living people
1962 births
Historians of Germany
21st-century American historians
21st-century American male writers
Vanderbilt University faculty
American male non-fiction writers